The Roman Catholic fraternity Askania-Burgundia is the founding fraternity of the Kartellverband katholischer deutscher Studentenvereine (KV).  It is a Catholic Studentenverbindung. The headquarters of Askania-Burgundia are located in Berlin, Germany. Based on the Roman Catholic faith, Askania-Burgundia strictly refuses academic fencing. Its members do not wear couleur. Askania-Burgundia's principles are religio (religion), scientia (science) and amicitia (friendship).

History 
Georg von Hertling (a university student who later became imperial German chancellor) founded Askania-Burgundia in 1853. The root of the fraternity was a Catholic academic reader circle. During the German Kulturkampf (literally, "culture struggle") in the late 19th century the fraternity became an important meeting point for Catholic students in Berlin.

Members 
Askania-Burgundia's members are all male. Among its members, there have been several German chancellors, such as Wilhelm Marx, Kurt Georg Kiesinger and Konrad Adenauer as well as industrial managers such as Heinrich Nordhoff, chief of the Volkswagen company, and several famous scientists. The membership is only open to baptized students of the universities in Berlin and Brandenburg. The requirements to the members in respect to capability of teamwork and in respect to academic accomplishment are severe.

Address of the Headquarters 
Askania-Burgundia, Pücklerstrasse 24, 14195 Berlin-Dahlem, Germany

References 
 Joseph Oppenhoff (Hrsg): Askania 1853-1928. Aachen, 1928.
 Joseph Oppenhoff (Hrsg): Burgundia 1853-1928. Aachen, 1928.
 Michael F. Feldkamp (Ed.): Askania-Burgundia 1853-2003. Festschrift zum 150. Bestehen des Katholischen Studentenvereins Askania-Burgundia. Berlin, 2003
 Michael F. Feldkamp: Kurt Georg Kiesinger und seine Berliner Studentenkorporation Askania auf dem Weg ins "Dritte Reich",  in: Günter Buchstab/Philipp Gassert/Peter Thaddäus Lang (Hrsg.): Kurt Georg Kiesinger 1904-1988. Von Ebingen ins Kanzleramt, Hrsg. im Auftrag der Konrad-Adenauer-Stiftung e. V. (= Herder Taschenbuch), Freiburg im Breisgau, Basel, Wien 2005, S. 149-199, 
 Josef Forderer (Ed.): Alamannia. Tübingen, 1968
 Philipp Gassert (Ed.): Kurt Georg Kiesinger - Kanzler zwischen den Zeiten DVA-Verlag, München, 2005
 Michael F. Feldkamp: Oppenhoff, Joseph, in: Siegfried Koß/Wolfgang Löhr (Ed.), Biographisches Lexikon des KV, Teil 6, unter Mitarbeit von Gisela Hütz (= Revocatio historiae. Schriften der Historischen Kommission des Kartellverbandes katholischer deutscher Studentenvereine [KV] in Zusammenarbeit mit der Gemeinschaft für deutsche Studentengeschichte [GDS], Bd. 7), Köln 2000, S. 77

External links
Homepage of the fraternity

Askania
1853 establishments in Prussia
1853 establishments in Germany
Organisations based in Berlin
Catholic Church in Germany
Student religious organisations in Germany
Youth organisations based in Germany

Student organizations established in 1853